Liars in Love is a collection of short stories by Richard Yates, published in 1981. All of the stories also appeared in the posthumously released Richard Yates, The Collected Stories (2004), which includes other stories.

Contents
"Oh, Joseph, I'm So Tired"
"A Natural Girl"
"Trying Out for The Race"
"Liars in Love"
"A Compassionate Leave"
"Regards at Home"
"Saying Goodbye to Sally"

1981 short story collections
Short story collections by Richard Yates